The 2017 Liga 3 East Nusa Tenggara (also known as XXVIII El Tari Memorial Cup) is the third edition of Liga 3 East Nusa Tenggara as a qualifying round for the national round of 2017 Liga 3. PSN Ngada are the defending champions.

Teams
There are 19 clubs which will participate the league in this season.

Group stage 
This stage scheduled starts on 22 July 2017.

Group A

Group B

Group C

Group D

Second round

References 

2017 in Indonesian football